The 2022 Challenger de Buenos Aires was a professional tennis tournament played on clay courts. It was the eleventh edition of the tournament which was part of the 2022 ATP Challenger Tour. It took place in Buenos Aires, Argentina between 26 September and 2 October 2022.

Singles main-draw entrants

Seeds

 1 Rankings are as of 19 September 2022.

Other entrants
The following players received wildcards into the singles main draw:
  Román Andrés Burruchaga
  Lautaro Midón
  Juan Bautista Otegui

The following player received entry into the singles main draw using a protected ranking:
  Sumit Nagal

The following player received entry into the singles main draw as a special exempt:
  Mariano Navone

The following players received entry into the singles main draw as alternates:
  Facundo Díaz Acosta
  Gonzalo Villanueva

The following players received entry from the qualifying draw:
  Nicolás Álvarez
  Hernán Casanova
  Facundo Juárez
  Wilson Leite
  Ignacio Monzón
  Thiago Seyboth Wild

The following player received entry as a lucky loser:
  Carlos Sánchez Jover

Champions

Singles

  Juan Manuel Cerúndolo def.  Camilo Ugo Carabelli 6–4, 2–6, 7–5.

Doubles

  Guido Andreozzi /  Guillermo Durán def.  Román Andrés Burruchaga /  Facundo Díaz Acosta 6–0, 7–5.

References

2022 ATP Challenger Tour
2022
2022 in Argentine tennis
September 2022 sports events in Argentina
October 2022 sports events in Argentina